68 Aquarii is a single star located 270 light years away from the Sun in the zodiac constellation of Aquarius. 68 Aquarii is its Flamsteed designation, though it also bears the Bayer designation of g2 Aquarii. It is visible to the naked eye as a dim, yellow-hued star with an apparent visual magnitude of 5.24. The object is moving further from the Earth with a heliocentric radial velocity of +24.5 km/s.

This star is 3.79 billion years old with a stellar classification of G8 III, indicating the star is a giant star that has exhausted the hydrogen at its core and expanded off the main sequence. It is a red clump giant, which means it is on the horizontal branch and is generating energy through helium fusion at its core. It has 1.39 times the mass of the Sun and 10 times the Sun's radius. The star is radiating 59 times the luminosity of the Sun from its enlarged photosphere at an effective temperature of 5,036 K.

References

G-type giants
Horizontal-branch stars
High-proper-motion stars
Aquarius (constellation)
Aquarii, g2
BD-20 6486
Aquarii, 068
215721
112529
8670